François C. Antoine Simon (a.k.a. Antoine Simon) (October 10, 1843 – March 10, 1923) was President of Haiti from 6 December 1908 to 3 August 1911.  He led a rebellion against Pierre Nord Alexis and succeeded him as president.

Biography
Francois C. Antoine Simon was born on 10 October 1843 in Les Cayes, Haiti, and died either on 10 January or 10 March 1923 in Les Cayes.  He was originally from the town of Savane near Les Cayes and initially worked as a municipal police officer before joining the army as an officer.

In 1883 he was appointed commander of the troops in Sud, a post he held until 1908.  During his military career, he was promoted to colonel in 1887.  Between 1896 and 1902, He was aide-de-camp of the President Tirésias Simon Sam and was later promoted to general.  It was as a general that he led a military revolt against President Pierre Nord Alexis.

Presidency 1908–1911
On 6 December 1908, he was appointed successor to President Alexis. Although he had little formal education himself, he assembled an advisory group consisting of influential men.  On 19 December 1908 he announced his six-member cabinet and took the oath of office before Senator Paulin.

One of his first policy decisions was to pursue an appeasement policy allowing exiled Haitians to return. This set the stage for some stability during the early years of his mandate. President Simon strove constantly to improve agricultural production.  He also had the intention of building a nationwide railway network. To accomplish this required several contracts with American companies, including the so-called "MacDonald Contract" – a contract to build a railway line between Port-au-Prince and Cap-Haïtien. Embedded in these negotiations was the cultivation and export of sugar and bananas by the Haitian American Sugar Company. However, these contracts were poorly prepared, leading to criticism from intellectuals and politicians alike.  On the other hand, the contracts led directly to the paving of streets and electrification of Port-au-Prince.  As a result of the modern roads, there was an increase in the presence of cars in Haiti.

To satisfy American banana plantations, Haitian companies were taxed, resulting in unrest by small landowners who ultimately paid the price. Small farmers in the north (Cacos) then began to revolt in June 1911.  General Cincinnatus Leconte, a former Minister of Public Works and Agriculture under Simon Sam, took advantage of the situation to lead a coup d'état against Simon.

Leconte's initial campaign failed, but a subsequent attempt in August 1911 succeeded in the capture of Port-au-Prince.  Simon was ousted from power by supporters of Leconte, who was his successor as President.  Simon went into exile for several years, but returned to Haiti where he died in Les Cayes.

In Tell My Horse, Zora Neale Hurston recounts the elaborate Catholic funeral Simon gave to his pet goat Simalo upon the goat's death.

Family
His ancestors are Pierre Baptiste Simon, Toussaint Louverture. One of President A. Simon’s daughter Anézulia Simon married Sergeant Lubencius Lubin whose  children are: Antoine Lubin, Thérese Lubin, Darius Lubin, Alexandre Lubin, Damien Lubin, Claire Lubin;  Ulysses Simon, and Celestina was a voodoo priestess, Antoine Simon Jeune (Antoinier) whose children with his wife Sanite Augustin are: Max, Alex, Amede, Cecile.  A grandson named Charite Simon, and his great-grandchildren Romane Antoine Simon, James Simon, Sintilma Simon, Esther Simon, Sylvie Simon, Emmanuella Simon, Jean Marie Simon. He also had 2 great-great-grandsons named Marcel Simon and Sean Valere

References

External links
 Biography in rulers.org
 Haitian Presidents
 Chapter XXIX, Haiti History Chapters, in: Haitiwebs.com
 Biography in Haitianmedia
 Fearon, James D./ Laitin, David D.: Haiti , Stanford University, 2006 (PDF-Datei; 259 kB)
 Decades Of Instability, 1843–1915, Library Of Congress, 1989
 World History: Haiti 1859–1915

Presidents of Haiti
1843 births
1923 deaths
1900s in Haiti
1910s in Haiti
20th-century Haitian politicians